Jose 'Gaby' Canizales (born May 1, 1960) is an American former professional boxer who won the Lineal championship in the bantamweight division.

Early life
Canizales was born in Laredo in Webb County, Texas.

Pro career
Canizales turned pro in 1979 and in 1983 challenged Jeff Chandler for the World Boxing Association (WBA) bantamweight title but lost a decision.  In 1986 he landed a shot at Richie Sandoval for the Lineal and WBA bantamweight title. Canizales dominated, and knocked Sandoval down once in the 1st, once in the 5º, and three times in the 7th round, winning via a 7th-round knockout.  He lost the belt in his first defense to Bernardo Pinango via decision. In 1990, he challenged Raúl Pérez for the World Boxing Council bantamweight title but lost a decision. In 1991, he fought Miguel Lora for the vacant World Boxing Organization bantamweight title and won via 2nd-round knockout, after being dropped in round one by the Colombian. He lost the belt in his first defense to Duke McKenzie via decision, and retired after the loss.

He is the brother of former bantamweight champion Orlando Canizales. Both brothers obtained the title of world boxing champion at the same age and weight.

The Orlando & Gaby Canizales Boxing Gym and Community Center on Guadalupe Street in Laredo is named in  honor of the brothers. The facility was expanded in 2014.

Professional boxing record

See also
List of bantamweight boxing champions
List of WBA world champions
List of WBO world champions

References

External links
 
 Gaby Canizales - CBZ Profile

1960 births
Living people
Boxers from Texas
Bantamweight boxers
World boxing champions
World bantamweight boxing champions
World Boxing Association champions
World Boxing Organization champions
American boxers of Mexican descent
People from Laredo, Texas
American male boxers